Moshe Zvi (Hirsch) Segal (Hebrew: משה צבי סגל) (born 23 September 1875; died 11 January 1968) was an Israeli rabbi, linguist and Talmudic scholar.

Biography 
Segal was born in Maishad, Lithuania in 1875. In 1896, he moved with his family to Scotland and subsequently to London. He was ordained as a rabbi in 1902 and later obtained a degree from Oxford University.  He was the Rabbi of the United Hebrew Congregation of Newcastle upon Tyne from 1910 to 1918, when he went to the
British Mandate of Palestine as a member of the Zionist Commission with Chaim Weizmann.

Academic career
In 1926 he was appointed lecturer at the Hebrew University, where he was promoted to a chair in Bible and Semitic languages in 1939.

Awards and recognition 
 In 1936 (jointly with Raphael Patai) and again in 1950, Segal was awarded the Bialik Prize for Jewish Thought.
 In 1954, he was awarded the Israel Prize, for Jewish studies.

See also 
List of Israel Prize recipients
List of Bialik Prize recipients

References 

Israel Prize in Jewish studies recipients
Israel Prize Rabbi recipients
Members of the Israel Academy of Sciences and Humanities
Israeli Orthodox rabbis
English rabbis
Lithuanian Jews
Lithuanian emigrants to Mandatory Palestine
Jews in Mandatory Palestine
Israeli Jews
Alumni of the University of Oxford
1875 births
1968 deaths